Beiersdorf (Coburg) is the Western district of the Bavarian city of Coburg.

With a population of 1,421 on 7,31 km2, it has a population density of 194 per km2.
Beiersdorf is the home of the Waldorf school Coburg and the summer residence of the dukes of Coburg, Schloss Callenberg.

References

Peter Morsbach, Otto Titz: City of Coburg. Ensembles-monuments Archaeological monuments. Monuments in Bavaria. Volume IV.48. Karl M. Lipp Verlag, Munich 2006, 

Coburg